Joyo may refer to:
 Joyo (tribe) in Pakistan
 Jōyō, Kyoto, a city in Japan
 Jōyō, Fukuoka, a former town in Japan
 Jōyō kanji, a set of characters used in Japanese writing
 Joyo Bank, a banking company in Japan
 Joyo.com, a Chinese website acquired by Amazon.com
 Jōyō (nuclear reactor), a liquid metal research reactor